The Kulik Express is an Express train belonging to Eastern Railway zone that runs between  and  in India. It is currently being operated with 13053/13054 train numbers on a daily basis.

After 1 July 2019, it was extended to Radhikapur and named as Howrah–Radhikapur Express. And after some time on 25 April 2020, it was renamed as Kulik Express after the Kulik Bird Sanctuary of Raiganj.

Speed

This train has an average speed of 46 km/h and covers 487 km in 10 Hours 40 Minutes. The maximum permissible speed of this train is 110 km/h

Route and halts 

Between Howrah Junction and Radhikapur this train stops at -

Coach composition

The train runs with Modern LHB Rake with max speed of 110 km/h. The train consists of 13 coaches:

 1 AC Chair Car
 5 Unreserved Chair Car
 4 Reserved Chair Car
 2 Deen dayalu coaches 
 2 Generators cum Luggage/parcel van

Schedule
The schedule of this 13053/13054 Howrah–Radhikapur Kulik Express is given below:-

Traction

Both trains are hauled by a Howrah Loco Shed- based WDM-3D diesel locomotive from Malda to Radhikapur and by a WAP-5 from Malda to Howrah .

See also 

 Howrah Junction railway station
 Radhikapur railway station
 Howrah–Rampurhat Express
 Howrah–Balurghat Bi-Weekly Express
 Kolkata–Radhikapur Express

Notes

External links 

 13053/Kulik Intercity Express
 13054/Kulik Intercity Express

References 

Rail transport in Howrah
Intercity Express (Indian Railways) trains
Rail transport in West Bengal
Railway services introduced in 2011